The 1996 United States presidential election in Michigan took place on November 5, 1996. All 50 states and the District of Columbia, were part of the 1996 United States presidential election. Voters chose 18 electors to the Electoral College, which selected the president and vice president.

Michigan was won by incumbent United States President Bill Clinton of Arkansas, who was running against Kansas Senator Bob Dole. Clinton ran a second time with former Tennessee Senator Al Gore as Vice President, and Dole ran with former New York Congressman Jack Kemp.

Michigan weighed in for this election as 5% more Democratic than the national average. The presidential election of 1996 was a very multi-partisan election for Michigan, with nearly 10% of the electorate voting for third-party candidates. In typical form for the State, the Upper Peninsula of Michigan turned out mainly Democratic, and the Lower Peninsula turned out divided, but more Republican - with the notable exception of Detroit's highly populated Wayne County, which voted overwhelmingly Democratic. In his second bid for the presidency, Ross Perot led the newly reformed Reform Party to gain over 8% of the votes in Michigan, and to pull in support nationally as the most popular third-party candidate to run for United States Presidency in recent times. This marked the first time since 1968 that the state voted Democratic in consecutive elections.

, this is the last election in which Houghton, Alcona, Cheboygan, Crawford, Dickinson, Kalkaska, Luce, Mackinac, Mecosta, Lapeer, Keweenaw, Montcalm, Tuscola, Branch, Baraga, Chippewa, Huron, Wexford, Osceola, Montmorency, and Oscoda counties voted for a Democratic presidential candidate. This is also the last time all counties in the Upper Peninsula voted for a Democrat.

Results

Results by county

Counties that flipped from Democratic to Republican
Charlevoix (Largest city: Charlevoix)

Counties that flipped from Republican to Democratic
Branch (Largest city: Coldwater)
Chippewa (Largest city: Sault Ste. Marie)
Gratiot (Largest city: Alma)
Huron (Largest city: Bad Axe)
Lapeer (Largest city: Lapeer)
Macomb (Largest city: Warren)
Mason (Largest city: Ludington)
Oakland (Largest city: Troy)
Oceana (Largest city: Pentwater)
Osceola (Largest city: Reed City)
Oscoda (Largest city: Mio)
St. Clair (Largest city: Port Huron)

See also
 Presidency of Bill Clinton
 United States presidential elections in Michigan

References

Michigan
1996
1996 Michigan elections